The Moyo River is a river of Sumbawa, West Nusa Tenggara province, Indonesia, about 1200 km east of capital Jakarta.

Geography 
The river flows along the northwestern area of Sumbawa with predominantly tropical savanna climate (designated as As in the Köppen-Geiger climate classification). The annual average temperature in the area is 26 °C. The warmest month is October, when the average temperature is around 30 °C, and the coldest is February, at 24 °C. The average annual rainfall is 1456 mm.. The wettest month is January, with an average of 294 mm rainfall, and the driest is August, with 19 mm rainfall.

See also
List of rivers of Indonesia
List of rivers of Lesser Sunda Islands

References

Rivers of Sumbawa
Rivers of West Nusa Tenggara
Rivers of Indonesia